Tevfik Köse (born 12 July 1988) is a Turkish professional footballer who plays as a forward for German club DV Solingen.

Club career
Tevfik Köse began his career with Fortuna Düsseldorf and signed in summer 2001 for Bayer Leverkusen. He started his professional career with Bayer Leverkusen in the 2005–06 season for the reserve team. After two years at Bayer Leverkusen he left Germany on loan for Ankaraspor in August 2007. After his return from loan he was loaned out to Kayserispor for the 2008–09 season .

On 31 December 2009, Köse signed with İstanbul Büyükşehir Belediyespor for two and a half years.

International career
Köse was a part of Turkey's U17 squad at the FIFA U-17 World Championship. Tevfik Köse finished tied for second top scorer of the competition.

He was also part of the squad that finished runner-up in the 2012 Toulon Tournament and scored a goal in the 1–0 win against France in the semi-final.

References

External links
 
 
 
 

1988 births
Living people
Turkish footballers
Association football forwards
Turkey B international footballers
Turkey under-21 international footballers
Turkey youth international footballers
German footballers
German people of Turkish descent
Süper Lig players
Fortuna Düsseldorf players
Bayer 04 Leverkusen players
Bayer 04 Leverkusen II players
Ankaraspor footballers
Kayserispor footballers
İstanbul Başakşehir F.K. players
Çaykur Rizespor footballers
Boluspor footballers
Adana Demirspor footballers
Tuzlaspor players
Sakaryaspor footballers
Footballers from Düsseldorf